René Touzet y Monte (September 8, 1916 in Havana, Cuba – June 15, 2003 in Miami, Florida) was a Cuban-born American composer, pianist and bandleader.

Career as bandleader
Living in the city of Cojimar, he learned classical piano from the age of 4, and went on to study at the Falcón Conservatory in Havana.   By 1934 his classical training ended because of his family's financial hardship, and he accepted a job as a pianist in Luis Rivera's jazz band.  Soon afterwards he became the leader of a 16-piece orchestra, playing big band music at the Grand Casino in Havana, and also began writing his own compositions.  One of his most famous songs, "No Te Importe Saber", was recorded with lyrics by Mitchell Parish as "Let Me Love You Tonight", by Bing Crosby, Frank Sinatra, Dean Martin and others.

In 1944, after his club in Cuba was destroyed by a hurricane, Touzet moved to the USA where he joined a band led by Enric Madriguera.  The band then moved to Hollywood, where Touzet met Desi Arnaz, and joined his band for a while.  He also worked as pianist, songwriter and arranger with Xavier Cugat and Stan Kenton.  

After forming his own orchestra in the mid-1950s, he successfully recorded eleven albums for producer Gene Norman on his GNP Crescendo label between 1955 and 1964, and performed regularly at Norman's Crescendo night club.  One of his best known arrangements of this period, "El Loco Cha Cha", provided R&B singer Richard Berry with the "riff" for his classic pop song "Louie Louie". Touzet remained a popular bandleader through the 1960s, incorporating pachangas and other new rhythms into his compositions, without losing touch with the boleros and cha-chas that brought him his first fame.

Later years and family
In 1972 Touzet retired from performing popular music and moved to Miami, Florida, devoting his remaining years to composing for the piano, in a style blending Cuban folk music and jazz with classical music.  His published compositions for piano include Cuarenta Danzas, Cuatro Caprichos, Ginasteriana, Fantasía Española, Cinco Danzas Exóticas, Vals Arabesco, Tres Miniaturas, and the Sonata Romántica.

Touzet was married to Isabel Gonzalez (1917-1991) and they had two daughters, Olivia and Nilda Touzet-Gonzalez. He had three other daughters: Olga Maria Touzet-Guillot (with singer Olga Guillot), Lisa Bahadoor, and Bonita Calderon. He later married Mercy Remos.

Touzet was given several honors and awards for his musical contributions, and in 2001 the mayor of Miami declared September 9 as "René Touzet Day."   He died of heart complications in 2003.

Selected discography

RCA Victor Records
Dinner in Havana (LPM-1016, 1954)

GNP Crescendo Records
The Cha Cha Cha and the Mambo [also released as The Charm of the Cha Cha Cha] (GNP-14, 1955)
From Broadway to Havana (GNP-22, 1957)
Cha Cha Cha for Lovers (GNP-29, 1957)
Mr. Cha Cha Cha (GNP-36, 1958)
René Touzet and His Orchestra Play for Dancing at the Crescendo on the World Famous Sunset Strip (GNP-40, 1959)
Touzet Too Much! (GNP-49, 1960)
The Timeless Ones a la Touzet (GNP-52, 1961)
La Pachanga (GNP-57, 1961)
Pachanga Differente! (GNP-61, 1961)
Greatest Latin Hits! (GNP-74, 1962) compilation
Touzet Goes to the Movies (GNP-81, 1962)
Bossa Nova! Brazil to Hollywood (GNP-87, 1963)
The Best of René Touzet and His Orchestra (GNPS-2000, 1964) compilation

SEECO Records
Beso de Fuego (7212 A, 19??)
Hijo Mio (7212 B, 19??)
No Puedo Ser Feliz (7728, 19??)
Pensando en Ti (7172 A, 19??)
Pretender (7293 A, 19??)
Punal en el Alma (7728, 19??)
Noche Azul (7729, 19??)
No Te Importe Saber (7729, 19??)
Te Quiero (7172 B, 19??)
Yo Volvere (7293 B, 19??)

References

External links and main source
 – official site

René Touzet discography
Enrique Hernandez, "Sunset on a Golden Age", The Miami Herald, October 8, 2007
Audio recordings of - Rene Touzet and his Orchestra with vocalists: Elsa Miranda, Reinaldo Henriquez and Irene Valencia on Archive.org

1916 births
2003 deaths
Cuban musicians
Cuban emigrants to the United States
People from Havana
People from Miami
American bandleaders
20th-century American musicians